HaAh HaGadol 6 (lit. The Big Brother 6) is the sixth season of the Israeli version of the reality show Big Brother. The season began broadcasting on 14 May 2014 and ended on 30 August 2014. Fifteen housemates entered the house during the premiere.
For the first time in Israel, four housemates from previous seasons and one ex-housemate who left the house for medical reasons came back as official housemates and competed again for the main prize.

This season also created controversy, because of the Israel-Gaza conflict, which forced the housemates, when they heard the sirens of the rockets, to go to a safe area of the house.

Housemates

Achi 
Achi Natan, 25, Kiryat Shmona

Anna 
 Anna Bul, 26, Tel Aviv

Benny 
 Benny Goldstein, 37, Ashkelon. 
 He previously appeared on HaAh HaGadol 5 where he was the third evicted.

Danit 
 Danit Greenberg, 22, Petah Tikva

Doron 
 Doron Miran, 51, Givatayim

Einav 
 Einav Boublil, 29, Ashkelon. 
 She previously finished in fourth place in HaAh HaGadol 1.

Elad 
 Elad "Prince" Mizrachi, 27, Netanya

Eldad 
 Eldad Gal-Ed, 31, Tel Aviv (formerly from the abandoned Ganei Tal settlement in the Gaza Strip)

Eliav 
 Eliav Uzan, 30, Tel Aviv (originally from Kiryat Shmona)

Karin 
 Karin Zalayet, 27, Tel Aviv (originally from Givatayim)

Linor 
 Linor Sheffer, 28, New York City, US (originally from Karmiel)

Martine 
 Martine Solal, 57, Paris, France

Menahem 
 Menahem Ben, 65, Nofim. 
 He previously finished in third place on HaAh HaGadol VIP.

Mickey 
 Mickey "Myakiagi" Hirschmann, 46, Olesh (originally from Petah Tikva)

Nofar
 Nofar Mor, 25, Tel Aviv. 
 She previously finished in third place on HaAh HaGadol 3.

Ortal B 
 Ortal Ben Dayan, 32, Tel Aviv (originally from Kiryat Shmona)

Ortal G 
 Ortal Goshen, 22, Lod (originally from Safed). 
 On Day 5 she walked, due to medical reasons. But she returned on Day 46 part of the new housemates that entered

Tal 
 Tal Gilboa, 35, Kfar Saba

Tzachi 
 Tzachi Ashkenazi, 33, Lod

Nominations table

Notes 

 This week, the public did the nominating. The seven housemates with the most votes were up for eviction.
 Elad was nominated by public voting. 
 Doron was nominated by public voting. 
 This week, the public did the nominating. the four housemates with the fewest votes were up for eviction.
 Myakiagi won immunity due to his win in the Raising Star task.
 Prior to week 6's task, the housemates decided that Martine will be immune from eviction and Danit is up for eviction.
 Anna was nominated by public voting. 
 Based on 2014 FIFA World Cup, each housemate represented a country. To get immunity, their countries had to pass to the quarter-finals. Einav (Argentina), Martine (France), Linor (Belgium), Tzachi (Germany), Nofar (Netherlands), Eliav (Brazil), Danit (Costa Rica) and Ortal G (Colombia) won immunity. All the non-immune were nominated.
 Nominations had the same format as last week. Although this time, only the housemates that represented countries that passed to the semi-finals would be immune. For that, only Einav, Tzachi, Nofar and Eliav were immunes. Unlike last week, housemates not immunes were not nominated. They were only eligible to be nominated.
 Tal was nominated by public voting. 
 The eviction was originally to be on Saturday, Day 60. Although, it was postponed for Wednesday, Day 64 because the news program got 30-minute extra because of the Israel-Gaza conflict. On Wednesday, the eviction was postponed for Saturday, Day 67. As a result, week 9 nominees were the same as Week 8.
 Eliav was nominated by public voting. 
 All Housemates are up for eviction as two will be evicted, one on Wednesday and one on Saturday.
 The second eviction was originally to be on Saturday, Day 81. Although, it was postponed once again for Wednesday, Day 85 because the news program got extra time. On Wednesday, the eviction was postponed for Saturday, Day 88. As a result, week 12 nominees were the same as week 11.
 Linor was banned from nominating because while in the House, her sister told her to nominate Achi and Danit. Later, Big Brother called her to the Diary Room and asked her two nominees. She said Achi and Danit, confirming what her sister told her.
 Eliav was nominated by public voting.
 Prior to this week's task Eldad qualified for the finale.
 Achi was nominated by public voting.
 There were no nominations in the final week and the public was voting for housemates to win, rather than being saved. The housemate with the most SMS votes was the winner.

Nominations totals received

References

External links
  

2014 Israeli television seasons
06